Rich Township may refer to:

 Rich Township, Cook County, Illinois
 Rich Township, Anderson County, Kansas
 Rich Township, Lapeer County, Michigan
 Rich Township, Cass County, North Dakota, in Cass County, North Dakota

Township name disambiguation pages